Sarcohyla celata, also known as the Oaxaca treefrog, is a species of frog in the family Hylidae. It is endemic to Mexico and only known from the Sierra de Juárez in northern Oaxaca. After having not been seen after 1984, it was feared that the species might be extinct. However, the species was rediscovered in field surveys during 2011–2014 and some subpopulations are at healthy levels.

Taxonomy
This species was described in 1995 based on specimens collected in 1969–1970  that were first identified as Hyla siopela (now Sarcohyla siopela), as well as few specimens collected from another nearby locality in 1978–1981.

Description
Sarcohyla celata is a moderately-sized frog. Adult males measure  and females  in snout–vent length (although the largest specimen was a male, females are larger on average). The snout is blunt. The tympanum is evident. The fingers are long and have vestigial webbing whereas the toes are moderately webbed. The dorsum is bronze brown or leaf green and has scattered, distinct black flecks, mostly on the lateral surfaces of the body. The eyes are bronze with black reticulations. Adult males have prepollex that is ossified, enlarged, and blunt (the "spikethumb"), and bears small nuptial excrescences.

Habitat and conservation
They breed in streams. Individuals have been found on a mossy rock wall at night, sitting in the spray of a small waterfall, and in direct sunlight on rocks in the middle of a stream.

Sarcohyla celata has always been a rare species. The decline of the species has been attributed to chytridiomycosis, habitat loss and change caused by logging and other human activities, and desiccation. The population has recovered and is now considered stable.

References

celata
Endemic amphibians of Mexico
Fauna of the Sierra Madre de Oaxaca
Amphibians described in 1995
Taxonomy articles created by Polbot